"He's So Shy" is a song recorded by American vocal group The Pointer Sisters for their seventh studio album Special Things (1980). Written, as "She's So Shy" and intended for Leo Sayer, in December 1979 by Tom Snow and Cynthia Weil, "He's So Shy" was released as the lead single from Special Things on July 23, 1980, by the Planet label.

"He's So Shy"'s fusion of classic girl group pop, new wave-styled dance music and R&B proved the right combination to effect a top-ten comeback for the sisters, the single reaching a peak of number three on the Billboard Hot 100 that October (it would hold that position during the same three weeks that "Woman in Love", by Barbra Streisand, held the number-one spot). "He's So Shy" set the prototype of the trademark Pointer Sisters sound which would afford the group its career peak in 1983–84 with their Break Out album.

Background
Tom Snow would recall of "He's So Shy": "It was the first time I'd actually written a melody that I knew in my heart was a smash", and that it had been at the BMI Awards banquet where he was honored for the success of his composition "You" that Snow had met lyricist Cynthia Weil who with her husband Barry Mann formed the iconic Mann/Weil songwriting team. Weil and Mann being in attendance at the banquet: Snow - "I did something I'm not prone to doing because I'm not a real self-promoter. I 'ginned-up' the courage, went over and introduced myself." After checking out Snow's output and being favorably impressed, Weil had agreed to collaborate with him, the inaugural Snow/Weil composition "Holdin' Out For Love" being recorded by Cher for her 1979 album Prisoner (an eventual R&B hit for Angela Bofill in 1982, "Holdin' Out..." was also recorded by The Pointer Sisters as a non-album cut utilized as the B-side of their 1981 hit "Slow Hand").

On his website, Snow recalls that the song was written very quickly after an extended period of struggling to come up with a hit:

"This one originated with the music and a working title, 'She's So Shy'. I had been plugging away for weeks trying to find a 'hit' hook. Everything I came up with sounded like derivative, melodic babble. Reduced to desperation one night I went into my studio after dinner and a few glasses of wine, set the Roland TR-808 to 120 beats per minute and started playing G minor arpeggios on my Prophet-5 synth. At least that was some viable form of music! That did the trick. Not having the pressure anymore of trying to come up with a smash hit, the vault opened up and within 30 minutes I had the melody, chord changes and a working title "She's So Shy". I knew immediately that I had come up with something very, very commercial. The feeling was intense. I remember leaving the studio three hours later after playing the tune hundreds of times and feeling like I was walking two inches above the floor. Not taking any chances I called Cynthia the next day and asked her to write the lyric. We both thought the song would be a smash and our instincts were right. "He's So Shy" sold 1.5 million copies. I will be forever indebted to those G minor arpeggios."

Although the title of "He's So Shy" recalls the girl group classic "He's So Fine" by The Chiffons, the former was in fact conceived by its composer as "She's So Shy" and was originally intended for Leo Sayer - Snow had co-written four songs for Sayer's 1977 album Thunder in My Heart (including the Top 40 title cut hit) and an additional four for Sayer's 1978 album Leo Sayer, both of which were produced by Richard Perry. By this time, however, Perry was no longer producing Sayer (subsequent to the Leo Sayer album) but "She's So Shy" came to his attention because Snow had signed with Perry's Braintree Music publishing firm in 1977, and Perry saw the potential of a gender-adjusted version of the song as a track for The Pointer Sisters, who'd inaugurated Perry's own Planet label with the 1978 number two hit "Fire".

According to group member Ruth Pointer, Perry's assigning the lead vocal on "He's So Shy" to June was a disappointment to Anita who Ruth says "wanted that song badly": Ruth has stated that Perry had recorded "He's So Shy" with Anita on lead but then opined: "I think I want June to record this [as lead]." 

Record World said that "June Pointer steps out on lead while an irresistible keyboard riff and snappy percussion drive this hit."

The Pointer Sisters made their music video debut with a promotional clip for "He's So Shy", described by Ruth as "a primitive affair, just the three of us dancing and lip-synching to the song inside the Bradbury Building in Downtown Los Angeles. Lots of stairs and elevators, but we made it work."

Live performances
The Pointer Sisters performed "He's So Shy" on The Love Boat episode broadcast February 7, 1981. The sisters portrayed members of the ship's housekeeping staff; when a record executive boards the ship, Isaac the bartender (Ted Lange) sees it as his chance to be discovered as a singer and recruits the sisters to be his background singers for a performance of the song. His plan backfires when the record executive praises the background singers and signs them to a record deal.

Personnel 
The Pointer Sisters
 June Pointer – lead vocals, backing vocals
 Ruth Pointer – backing vocals
 Anita Pointer – backing vocals

Musicians
  Tom Snow – keyboards, synthesizers
 Tim May – guitars 
 Nathan Watts – bass
 James Gadson – drums
 Paulinho da Costa – percussion

Charts

Weekly charts

Year-end charts

References

1980 singles
Disco songs
The Pointer Sisters songs
Number-one singles in New Zealand
Songs written by Tom Snow
Songs with lyrics by Cynthia Weil
Song recordings produced by Richard Perry
1980 songs
Planet Records singles
RCA Records singles